"Jamb Question" is a song by Nigerian singer and songwriter Simi. It serves as the second single from her second studio album, Simisola (2017). Produced by Oscar Herman-Ackah, the song was released on 15 February 2015. Its official remix features vocals from Nigerian rapper Falz. The music video for "Jamb Question" was nominated for Best Soft Rock/Alternative Video at the 9th Nigerian Music Video Awards.

Music video
The accompanying Mex-directed music video for "Jamb Question" premiered on 22 June 2015 through Simi's official Vevo account. Nigerian film producer and critic Charles Novia said he was "impressed" with the video and further said the song is reminiscent of Mo'Cheddah's hit "Dus Nambri", particularly in flow and rendition.

Critical reception

JimmyKing of TooXclusive gave the song 4.5 stars out of 5, stating, "Simi's Jamb Question is an improvement from her hit single "Tiff". The melody progression of the beat with the saxophone accompaniment gave the song a very wonderful effect. Simi’s voice is unique and it did justice to the song. This Afro pop song is rich with African instrumentation. The Ad lib (backup) was well done with harmonious combination of two the voices. Jamb Question is really a great song".<ref
name="tooxclusive"/> In the same vein, Sifon B. of Jaguda.com gave the song 4 stars out of 5, adding, "Jamb question puts in a blender Simi’s soothing voice, her comical lyrics, and a beautiful instrumental produced by Oscar, and the output is a smooth piece of auditory art".<ref
name="jaguda"/>

Awards and nominations

References

External links

2015 songs
Simi (singer) songs
Yoruba-language songs
Nigerian afropop songs